SC was an American-made air and surface-search radar used during World War II by the United States Navy. Variations include SC-1, SC-2 and SC-3.

Overview 
They were a longwave search sets, installed on destroyers and larger ships to search for planes and surface vessels and for control of interception. All sets have an "A" scope, provision for Identification friend or foe (IFF) connections, and work with a gyro-compass repeater. SC-2 and SC-3 also have PPI scopes, remote PPI's, and built-in BL and BI*antennas.

With antennas at 100', SC and SC-1 (without preamplifier) have a reliable maximum range of 30 miles on medium bombers at 1,000' altitude. With preamplifier, SC-1's range is extended to 75 miles – the same as that of SC-2 and SC-3. Range accuracy of SC is ± 200 yards; later models have an accuracy of ± 100 yds. bearing accuracy of SC and SC-21 is ± 5°; of SC-2 and SC-3, ± 3°. There is no elevation control on any of the sets, but height can be estimated roughly from positions of minimum signal strength.

Shipment includes spares for each set. If separate generator is needed, it is included in shipment. Not air transportable.

Both SC and SC-1 have 5 components weighing a total of 1800 lbs. SC-2 has 6 components weighing a total of 3,000 pounds. Weights and dimensions of antenna assemblies are 450 lbs. 6'111/2" x 8'6" for SC and SC-1; 478 lbs. 4'6" x 15' for SC-2 and SC-3. Antennas should be mounted as high as possible, preferably 100 feet or more, above other superstructures.

One operator per shift is minimum on all 3 sets. SC and SC-1 require primary power of 1500 watts at 115 volts, 60 cycles. SC-2 and SC-3 require 2500 watts at 115 volts, 60 cycles. All sets use ship's power of 115 volts, 60 cycles; transformer, if ship's power is 440 volts AC or 220 volts AC; motor generator if ship's power is DC.

On board ships

United States 
 Essex-class aircraft carrier
 Independence-class aircraft carrier
 Yorktown-class aircraft carrier
 Avenger-class escort carrier
 Casablanca-class escort carrier
 Long Island-class escort carrier
 Iowa-class battleship
 South Dakota-class battleship
 Colorado-class battleship
 
 New York-class battleship
 
 Gearing-class destroyer
 Allen M. Sumner-class destroyer
 Fletcher-class destroyer
 Gleaves-class destroyer
 Benson-class destroyer
 Sims-class destroyer
 Benham-class destroyer
 Somers-class destroyer
 Bagley-class destroyer
 Porter-class destroyer
 Mahan-class destroyer
 Farragut-class destroyer
 Wickes-class destroyer
 Sampson-class destroyer
 John C. Butler-class destroyer escort
 Rudderow-class destroyer escort
 Buckley-class destroyer escort
 Edsall-class destroyer escort
 Chiwawa-class oiler
 Kennebec-class oiler
 Patapsco-class gasoline tanker

Australia

Gallery

See also 

 List of radars
 Radar configurations and types
 Surveillance radar

Citations

References 

 Norman Friedman (2006). The Naval Institute Guide to World Naval Weapon Systems.  Naval Institute Press.  
 Buderi, Robert (1998). The Invention That Changed the World: How a Small Group of Radar Pioneers Won the Second World War and Launched a Technical Revolution. Touchstone. 
 Hezlet, Arthur (1975). Electronics and Sea Power. New York: Stein and Day. 

Naval radars
World War II radars
Military equipment introduced from 1940 to 1944
Military radars of the United States